Lickin' on Both Sides is the debut studio album by British R&B/UK garage group Mis-Teeq, released by Telstar Records on 29 October 2001. It was primarily produced by Stargate, with additional production from Jensen & Larsson, and Synth among others. The album became a top-five success in the United Kingdom, reaching number three on the national albums chart. The album was re-released three times, with the final release, a special edition, being released on 22 June 2002. Lickin' on Both Sides was certified double platinum in the UK. Altogether the album spawned five top-ten singles.

Track listing

Notes
 signifies additional producer

Production
 Nicky B. — keyboards
David Brant of Vybrant Music — keyboards
 Ceri Evans — keyboards
 Lloyd Anthony Gordon — keyboards
 Vocal production: Mushtaq, Peter Trotmann, Sabrina Washington, David Brant, Maryanne Morgan
 Vocal assistance: Ms Dorsett, Elisha Laverne, Maria Wallace, Maryanne Morgan
 Engineer: Jamie Lexton
 Mixing: Marshall & Burbree, Neil Tucker
 Mastering: Dick Beetham
 A&R manager: Billy Grant
 Design: solarcreative.co.uk
 Photography: Tim Brett-Day
Production Company: Louise Porter at Big out Ltd

Charts

Weekly charts

Year-end charts

Certifications

Release history

References 

2001 debut albums
Mis-Teeq albums
Albums produced by Stargate
Telstar Records albums